Phú Quý is a small island located about 100 km south-east of the city of Phan Thiết, Vietnam.  The island contains three communes, with a population of 20,698 people.  The island is home to Phu Quy Lighthouse (Hải đăng Phú Quý) situated in the north-west of the island and an abandoned military bunker on the eastern coast. 

During the French protectorate, the official name of the island was Poulo-Cécir-de-Mer(sometimes written as Pulau Cecir de Mer).

Geography 
Phú Quý district comprises a total of ten islands, with Phú Quý Island being the largest. The island is 16.5 km² in area. The district is 100 km southeast of Phan Thiết, 150 km south of Cam Ranh, 120 km east of Vũng Tàu, 333 km northeast of Côn Sơn and 540 km west of the Spratly Islands. The highest point on the island is Mount Cam Dat, at 106 m. The north of the island is rocky, while the south consists mostly of sand.

Administration
Phú Quý island has three communes:
Ngũ Phụng: Phú An (1), Thương Châu (2), Quý Thạnh (3)
Tam Thanh: Mỹ Khê (4), Hội An (5), Triều Dương (6)
Long Hải: Phú Long (7), Đông Hải (8), Quý Hải (9), Tân Hải (10).

Note: The numbers in parentheses is the former village name.

Tourism
Phú Quý is calling for domestic and foreign investors to invest in the island ideally to develop infrastructure, especially airports and hotels to serve tourists.

Transportation
Transport routes connecting the mainland and Phú Quý island are limited. During calm seas, the journey by ferry can take up to six hours, limiting tourism. However, in mid-2010, the cooperative shipping company Fortune put into operation a mid-speed ferry, shortening travel time to Phú Quý island to approximately 2.5-3h.

The mid-speed ferry was stopped in 2015 and after a year was replaced with a ferry that takes 4 hours running alongside the 6 hour ferry. In 2018 the mid-speed ferry was reinstated and now travel to the island takes 2.5 hours in favourable conditions.

See also 
List of islands of Vietnam

References

External links

 Phú Quý People's Committee

Islands of Vietnam
Fishing communities in Vietnam
Districts of Bình Thuận province
Landforms of Bình Thuận province